Clifton Avenue Historic District is a registered historic district in the Clifton neighborhood of Cincinnati, Ohio, listed in the National Register on December 8, 1978.  It contains 38 contributing buildings.

Historic uses 
Single Dwelling
School
Religious Structure

References

Historic districts in Cincinnati
Historic districts on the National Register of Historic Places in Ohio
National Register of Historic Places in Hamilton County, Ohio